The Mecha and Tulema Self-Help Association was an Oromo political and freedom social movement in Ethiopia. The movement was primarily based in Bale, but was active in other regions as well (including Finfinne). The organization was accused of committing acts of terror by the Ethiopian government, in hopes of suppressing the Oromo National Movement that was developing at the time. The Association was established by Oromo nationalists like Mamo Mezemer, Haile Mariam Gemeda and Alemu Kitessa.

History
Mecha and Tulema Self-Help Association is named after two of the major Borana Oromo clans Mecha and Tulema. It was established in the 1960s as a self-help club dedicated to promoting Oromo self-identity and providing basic infrastructures like school, health facilities, roads and water supplies to the Oromo people. But since political parties were not allowed at the time, associations such as Mecha-Tulema often took on political roles.

The organization attempted to involve Oromos in both cities and the countryside. It was most successful in the south, Arsi in particular, where Oromos had been relegated to the status of tenants on their own land after being conquered by Menelik's forces. At the height of its development, Mecha-Tulema claimed as many as 200,000 members. The leadership comprised educated Oromos who had been Amharized but subsequently rediscovered their culture, deciding to fight  for a fair share of the spoils of modernization.

The most prominent leader of  Mecha-Tulema was Tadesse Birru, a former general in the Ethiopian police force and the territorial army. He was from a Shewa Oromo family and had established himself firmly in Amhara culture. In fact, his Oromo origins were not apparent to many until he began to champion the cause of his people. Tadesse Birru appeared at organizational rallies in southern towns, delivering speeches critical of the government's policies towards Oromo areas and encouraging the people to demand justice. He carefully linked his appeal to the dignity of Oromo culture, a culture that, he emphasized, was being destroyed at the hands of Amhara.

By November 1966 the Haile Selassie regime became sufficiently alarmed at growth in the movement's popularity, and decided to arrest its top leadership including Tadesse Birru following a bomb explosion in an Addis Ababa movie house that was attributed to him. The Mecha-Tulama was banned shortly thereafter. Tadesse Birru was brought  to trial in 1968 and condemned to death, a sentence later commuted to life in prison. Mamo Mezemir was also sentenced to death and he was executed on February 28, 1969.

Mecha-Tulama was significant for several reasons. It was an indication that political sentiments could not be suppressed merely by forbidding political parties. The movement sensitized the Oromo  to the importance of their own national culture and to the contradiction inherent in the emerging politico-economic system.

The group that founded the Oromo Liberation Front in 1974 consisted largely of former members of this association.

References
6.  Olana Zoga Bojia. Gizetna Gizot Macha and Tulema Association, Amharic, 1996
Political organisations based in Ethiopia
Oromo people